The  Baltimore Brigade season is the second season for the franchise in the Arena Football League. The Brigade play home games at the Royal Farms Arena.

Standings

Staff

Roster

Schedule

Regular season
The 2018 regular season schedule was released on February 13, 2018.

Playoffs

References

Baltimore Brigade
Baltimore Brigade seasons
2010s in Baltimore
2018 in sports in Maryland